Sadio Doumbia and Fabien Reboul were the defending champions and successfully defended their title, defeating Guido Andreozzi and Guillermo Durán 7–5, 6–3 in the final.

Seeds

Draw

References

External links
 Main draw

Garden Open II - Doubles